Clongriffin railway station (Irish: Stáisiún Chluain Ghrifín) is a station at the western edge of Clongriffin on the northern section of the (DART), also accessible from Myrtle Avenue in Baldoyle and also serving other parts of northern Donaghmede, and Balgriffin.

Location
Clongriffin railway station is situated along the Dublin–Belfast railway line between Portmarnock railway station and Howth Junction.

History
The railway station was created as a part of the Northern Fringe Development plan and has been in operation since 19 April 2010.

Facilities
There are two active platforms.  A line splits off south of the station to provision a third platform, merging back just to the north; this platform is not in use.
The ticket office is open from 6 AM to 9 PM, Monday to Friday. It is closed on Saturday and Sunday.
There is an underground park-and-ride car park with 400 spaces, open from 6 AM to 9 PM, free of charge for the time being and bicycle parking. The northern terminus of the number 15 Dublin Bus route is also adjacent to the station which runs to Ballycullen in the south of the city via the city centre.

Proposed Dublin Airport Link

In 2011, it was suggested by Iarnród Éireann that Clongriffin station become a new junction station on the proposed Dublin Airport railway line extension. In the 'Rail Vision 2030' strategic network review document this proposed line extension was recommended as a long-term goal; the new line would carry DART commuter services.

See also 
 List of railway stations in Ireland

References

External links 

 Irish Rail Clongriffin Station Website

Iarnród Éireann stations in Dublin (city)
Railway stations in Fingal
Donaghmede
2010 establishments in Ireland
Railway stations opened in 2010
Railway stations in the Republic of Ireland opened in the 21st century